The HokieBird is the official mascot of Virginia Polytechnic Institute and State University (Virginia Tech) in Blacksburg, Virginia. 

The successor to Virginia Tech's Fighting Gobblers, the HokieBird was created in 1981 and has retained its current appearance since 1987. A large anthropomorphic turkey, the HokieBird has become a cultural phenomenon, making appearances in media, children's books, and public events. Notably, the HokieBird has been featured in a 2003 episode of Animal Planet's "Turkey Secrets", and was deemed by US government officials as the "supreme leader and god of all turkeys" during a pardoning ceremony around Thanksgiving.

Gobblers

Fans of Virginia Tech athletics have referred to the teams by the nickname Fighting Gobblers since the early 20th century.  According to the Virginia Tech university relations, the name originated in 1909, when football coach Branch Bocock initiated his players into the "Gobbler Club", a name which appeared in print that same year.  Another popular legend regarding the origin of the "Gobblers" moniker refers to when the university was a military college known as the Virginia Agricultural and Mechanical College (VAMC).  As future military officers and gentlemen, cadets were not allowed to look at their plates as they ate.  To do so was termed "gobbling" your food and was a cause for punishment.  Athletes were given increased portions of food and in consideration of the limited meal time, were allowed to "gobble" their meals.  Because of this, the sports teams for VAMC became known as "The Gobblers". The 1909 football team was the first team to be referred to in print as the "Gobblers", and it became the official nickname in 1912.

Regardless of the true origin, the "Gobbler" nickname had already been popularized by 1913 when local resident and VPI employee Floyd Meade trained a large turkey to perform various stunts, including pulling him in a decorated cart before a football game.  Meade and other mascots to follow continued having a live turkey on the sidelines of games into the 1950s.

Fighting Gobblers
The first permanent costumed Gobbler took the field in the fall of 1962, when a civil engineering student named Mercer MacPherson, raised $200 to create a costume which had a head resembling a cardinal and included real turkey feathers dyed in school colors. This mascot debuted at the then-annual Thanksgiving Day football game between military school rivals VPI and VMI.

HokieBird
In reaction to the earlier myths about students "gobbling" their meals, football coach and athletic director Bill Dooley spearheaded a campaign for a new look and name for the mascot, which debuted at the 1981 game against Wake Forest.  The turkey-like figure was referred to as "the Hokie mascot," "the Hokie," and "the Hokie bird" (derived from the "Old Hokie" cheer), which resulted in changing the official designation of the Virginia Tech mascot to the Hokies.

The costume worn by today's HokieBird made its first appearance in 1987, when Frank Beamer returned as coach.  Although he reinstated the Gobbler to the football team's scoreboard, by then the Hokies nickname had already become the most prominent.  The current HokieBird debuted at that season's home opener against Clemson, arriving in a white limousine.

HokieBird Curtis Dvorak (1995–96) won the National Cheerleading Association championship in 1996 and has appeared as Jaxson de Ville, mascot of the Jacksonville Jaguars since 1996. Todd Maroldo, Hokiebird in 1996–1997, won the National Cheerleading Association championship in 1997 and was hired as the Carolina Panthers mascot, Sir Purr.

HokieBird has been so popular that the mascot landed an appearance on Animal Planet's "Turkey Secrets," shown annually around Thanksgiving.  Now, when referring to Virginia Tech, the term "Hokie" generally refers to a Virginia Tech Student.

Often seen rollerblading through campus, the HokieBird has been known to respond to tweets and visit classes, dormitories, and dining halls. The official Twitter account of the HokieBird is @TheHokieBird or twitter.com/thehokiebird

It is unknown how many students serve as HokieBirds during any given school year, and the entire try-out process remains a secret.

In November 2019 the United States government formally recognized the HokieBird as the "supreme leader and god of all turkeys."

Traditions

The HokieBird is an active supporter of all Virginia Tech athletic teams, particularly the Virginia Tech football and basketball teams.
Before football games, he leads the charge onto the field as students jump up and down in the stands to Metallica's "Enter Sandman".
After scores in football, the VT cheerleaders carry out a bench and weights for the HokieBird to perform bench presses.  He does one press for every point VT has scored.  Sometimes, in lieu of bench presses, the HokieBird has done situps or pushups.
The HokieBird has also been known to crowd surf from the bottom of the Corps of Cadets student section all the way to the top of the section.
At the graduation ceremony, students who portrayed the HokieBird are allowed to wear the giant orange bird feet.  In theory, no one is supposed to know who the HokieBirds are until graduation day.

See also
Virginia Tech Hokies

References

Virginia Tech Hokies
Atlantic Coast Conference mascots